The Party of Labour of Albania (PPSh), sometimes referred to as the Albanian Workers' Party (AWP), was the ruling and sole legal party of Albania during the communist period (1945–1991). It was founded on 8 November 1941 as the Communist Party of Albania (PKSh) but changed its name in 1948. The party was dissolved on 13 June 1991 and succeeded by the Socialist Party of Albania. For most of its existence, the party was dominated by its First Secretary, Enver Hoxha, who was also the de facto leader of Albania.

Background
In the 1920s, Albania was the only Balkan country without a communist party. The first Albanian communists emerged from the followers of Albanian clergyman and politician Fan S. Noli. Once in Moscow, they formed the National Revolutionary Committee and became affiliated to the Comintern. In August 1928, the first Albanian Communist Party was formed in the Soviet Union. The most prominent figure of the party was Ali Kelmendi who left Albania in 1936, to fight in the Spanish Civil War. He was later regarded as the leader of a small group of Albanian Communists in France. However, no unified organisation existed in Albania until 1941.

History

World War II
Following the German attack on the Soviet Union in June 1941, Yugoslav leader Josip Broz Tito under Comintern directives sent two Yugoslav delegates Miladin Popović and Dušan Mugoša to Albania. These two helped unite the Albanian communist groups in 1941. After intensive work, the Albanian Communist Party was formed on 8 November 1941 by a delegates from Shkodër with Enver Hoxha from the Korça branch as its leader. Among the founding members, there were 8 Christian members: Koço Tashko, Koçi Xoxe, Pandi Kristo, Gjin Marku, Vasil Shanto, Tuk Jakova, Kristo Themelko and Anastas Lulo; and 5 Muslim members: Enver Hoxha, Qemal Stafa, Ramadan Çitaku, Kadri Hoxha and Sadik Premte.

The PKSh was the dominant element of the National Liberation Movement (LNC), formed in 1942. The LNC drove out the German occupiers (who had taken over from the Italians in 1943) on 29 November 1944. From that day onward, Albania was a full-fledged Communist regime. In every other Eastern European country, the Communists were at least nominally part of a coalition government for a few years before seizing power at the helm of out-and-out Communist regimes. King Zog was barred from ever returning to Albania, though the monarchy was not formally abolished until January 1946.

In the elections for the Constituent Assembly held on 2 December 1945, voters were presented with a single list from the Democratic Front, organised and led by the PKSh. The Front received 93.7% of the vote.

Hoxha era (1945–1985)
In a meeting with Joseph Stalin in July 1947 Stalin suggested the party be renamed to the "Party of Labour of Albania" because peasants were a majority in the country. Hoxha accepted this suggestion.

Under Hoxha, the party became the most rigidly anti-revisionist party in the Soviet Bloc. In 1961, Hoxha broke with Moscow over Nikita Khrushchev's supposed deviations from fundamental principles of Marxism-Leninism, though relations between Tirana and Moscow had begun to chill as early as 1955. Hoxha opted instead to align with the People's Republic of China under Mao Zedong. In 1968, Albania formally withdrew from the Warsaw Pact. The party even went as far as to engineer an Albanian version of China's Cultural Revolution.

After Mao's death, the PKSh felt increasing chagrin as Mao's successors moved away from his legacy. In 1978, Hoxha declared that Albania would blaze its own trail to a socialist society.

Hoxha led the party and state more or less without resistance until his death in 1985.

Post-Hoxha (1985–1991)
Hoxha's successor, Ramiz Alia, was forced to initiate gradual reforms in order to stop the country's economic downspiral. However, in late 1989, various elements of society began to speak out against the restrictions still in place. The execution of Romanian dictator Nicolae Ceauşescu led Alia to fear he would be next. In response, he allowed Albanians to travel abroad, ended the regime's longstanding policy of state atheism, and slightly loosened government control of the economy. However, these measures only served to buy Alia more time. Finally, bowing to the inevitable, on 11 December 1990, Alia announced that the PPSh had abandoned power and legalised opposition parties. The PPSh won the Constitutional Assembly elections of 1991. However, by then it was no longer a Marxist-Leninist party, and was powerless to prevent the adoption of a new interim constitution that formally stripped it of its monopoly of power.

In 1991, the PPSh dissolved and refounded itself as the social-democratic Socialist Party of Albania, which is now one of the two major political parties in Albania. A group called "Volunteers of Enver", led by Hysni Milloshi, laid claim to the identity of the PPSh as the Communist Party of Albania.

Structure
The ideology of the PPSh was an anti-revisionist variant of Marxism-Leninism known as Hoxhaism. The party organisation was built up following democratic centralist principles, with Hoxha as its First Secretary. Article 3 of Albania's 1976 Constitution identified the Party as the "leading political force of the state and of the society." To help carry out its ideological activities it had an associated mass organization known as the Democratic Front.

The highest organ of the Party, according to the Party statutes, was the Party Congress, which met for a few days every five years. Delegates to the Congress were elected at conferences held at the regional, district, and city levels. The Congress examined and approved reports submitted by the Central Committee, discussed general Party policies, and elected the Central Committee. The latter was the next-highest level in the Party hierarchy and generally included all key officials in the government, as well as prominent members of the Sigurimi. The Central Committee directed Party activities between Party Congresses and met approximately three times a year.

As in the Soviet Union, the Central Committee elected a Politburo and a Secretariat. The Politburo, which usually included key government ministers and Central Committee secretaries, was the main administrative and policy-making body and convened on a weekly basis. Generally, the Central Committee approved Politburo reports and policy decisions. The Secretariat was responsible for guiding the day-to-day affairs of the Party, in particular for organising the execution of Politburo decisions and for selecting Party and government cadres.

First Secretaries of the Party of Labour of Albania
Enver Hoxha, 8 November 1941 – 11 April 1985 
Ramiz Alia, 13 April 1985 – 13 June 1991

External following
The staunchly orthodox stand of the PPSh attracted many political groupings around the world, particularly among Maoists who were not content with the Communist Party of China's attitude in the late 1970s. A large number of parties declared themselves to be in the "PPSh line", especially during the period 1978–1980. However, many of them abandoned this certain affiliation after the fall of the socialist government in Albania. Today, many of the political parties upholding the political line of the PPSh are grouped around the International Conference of Marxist-Leninist Parties and Organisations.

The following parties were followers of the PPSh during the Cold War:
Communist Party of Denmark/Marxist–Leninists
Workers' Communist Party of France
Communist Party of Germany/Marxists–Leninists
Communist Party of Britain (Marxist–Leninist)
Revolutionary Communist Party of Britain (Marxist–Leninist)
Communist Movement M-L (Iceland)
Communist Party of Ireland (Marxist–Leninist)
Communist Party of Italy (Marxist–Leninist)
Portuguese Communist Party (Reconstructed)
Communist Party of Spain (Marxist–Leninist) (historical)
Communist Party Marxists-Leninists (revolutionaries) (Sweden)
Communist Party of Benin
Voltaic Revolutionary Communist Party
Union for People's Democracy (Senegal)
Communist Party of Canada (Marxist–Leninist)
Marxist–Leninist Popular Action Movement (Nicaragua)
Communist Party of Trinidad and Tobago
Communist Party of Brazil
Peruvian Communist Party – Red Flag
Revolutionary Vanguard (Communist Proletarian) (Peru)
Communist Party of Suriname
Communist Party of New Zealand

Friendship Associations
Various friendship associations were also formed by international Communist sympathizers who supported the Party:
China–Albania Friendship Association
Soviet–Albanian Friendship Society
USA–Albania Friendship Association
Friendship Association Norway–Albania
Spain–Albania Friendship Association
Swedish–Albanian Association

Electoral history

Parliamentary elections

See also 
Democratic Front of Albania
History of Albania
Fall of communism in Albania
Eastern Bloc politics
Politburo of the Party of Labour of Albania

References

Citations

Sources

External links
Documents of the Party of Labour of Albania
A speech delivered by E. Hoxha commemorating the 20th anniversary of the founding of the PPSh

 
Defunct political parties in Albania
Communist parties in Albania
Albania
Stalinist parties
Hoxhaist parties
Anti-revisionist organizations
Parties of one-party systems
People's Socialist Republic of Albania
Formerly ruling communist parties
Eastern Bloc
1941 establishments in Albania
1991 disestablishments in Albania
Political parties established in 1941
Political parties disestablished in 1991